Trapezonotus is a genus of dirt-colored seed bugs in the family Rhyparochromidae. There are about 19 described species in Trapezonotus.

Species
These 19 species belong to the genus Trapezonotus:

 Trapezonotus aeneiventris Kiritshenko, 1931
 Trapezonotus alticolus Zheng & Zou, 1981
 Trapezonotus anorus (Flor, 1860)
 Trapezonotus arenarius Linnaeus, 1758
 Trapezonotus compar Seidenstucker, 1971
 Trapezonotus derivatus Barber, 1918
 Trapezonotus desertus Seidenstucker, 1951
 Trapezonotus dispar Stal, 1872
 Trapezonotus diversus Barber, 1918
 Trapezonotus inglorius Vinokurov, 1990
 Trapezonotus lattini Scudder, 2008
 Trapezonotus singularis Kiritshenko & Scudder, 1969
 Trapezonotus subtilis Jakovlev, 1889
 Trapezonotus ullrichi (Fieber, 1837)
 Trapezonotus vandykei Van Duzee, 1937
 † Trapezonotus exterminatus Scudder, 1890
 † Trapezonotus riguus Statz & Wagner, 1950
 † Trapezonotus striatus Statz & Wagner, 1950
 † Trapezonotus stygialis Scudder, 1890

References

External links

 

Rhyparochromidae
Articles created by Qbugbot
Pentatomomorpha genera